Agrostis hallii is a species of grass known by the common name Hall's bentgrass.

Distribution
It is native to the west coast of the United States from far southern Washington to central California, where it grows in the woodlands and forests of the coastal mountain ranges.

Description
This is a rhizomatous perennial grass growing up to about a meter tall. It has flat leaves up to 20 centimeters long and thin or dense inflorescences of spikelets.

External links
Jepson Manual Treatment
USDA Plants Profile
Photo gallery

hallii
Flora of California
Flora of Oregon
Grasses of the United States
Native grasses of California
Flora without expected TNC conservation status